Atlético Granadilla is a semi-professional Spanish football team located in Granadilla de Abona, on the island of Tenerife in the autonomous community of the Canary Islands. Founded in 1959, the club currently competes in Group 3 of the Interinsular Preferente de Tenerife, the sixth tier of the Spanish football league system. It plays its homes games at Estadio Francisco Suárez, which has a capacity of 2,000.

Season to season

There are ten seasons in Tercera División.

See also
 Spanish football league system

External links
  
 Atlético Granadilla at Futbolme 

Football clubs in the Canary Islands
Sport in Tenerife
Association football clubs established in 1959
1959 establishments in Spain